Rakeem Cato (born March 28, 1992) is an American football quarterback for the Fayetteville Mustangs of the National Arena League (NAL). He played college football at Marshall and was the Thundering Herd's starting quarterback from 2011 to 2014. As a professional, he has played for the Montreal Alouettes of the Canadian Football League (CFL), Richmond Roughriders of the American Arena League (AAL), Gulf Coast Fire of the A-League, and Orlando Predators of the National Arena League (NAL).

Early years
Cato attended Miami Central High School in West Little River, Florida. During his career he passed for 9,412 yards with 103 touchdowns and 23 interceptions. He also holds numerous Miami-Dade County passing records.

College career
As a freshman in 2011, Cato completed 182 of 304 passes for 2,059 yards with 15 touchdowns and 11 interceptions.

As a sophomore in 2012, leading the nation in passing yards per game, he completed 406 of 584 passes for 4,201 yards with 37 touchdowns and 11 interceptions. With an outstanding season he won the Conference USA MVP.

His 2013 season held much promise with Cato being placed on the 2013 Players to Watch by The Touchdown Club of Columbus, and early on was already in the running of the 2013 Sammy Baugh award. Cato was also on the 2013 Maxwell Award watch list along with the Manning Award watch list. He ended the 2013 season with 39 touchdown passes, matching Chad Pennington's  Marshall record for touchdown passes in a single season. Cato was named MVP in the 2013 Military Bowl victory over Maryland.

Cato returned as the starter his senior season in 2014. On October 18, 2014, Cato threw a touchdown pass in his 39th consecutive game, breaking Russell Wilson's FBS record for most consecutive games with at least one touchdown pass. He finished the season with 3,903 yards, 40 touchdowns and 13 interceptions.

Cato finished his career with a school record 14,079 passing yards and 131 passing touchdowns.

Career statistics

Professional career
A February 2015 draft ranking by Mel Kiper, Jr. rated him as the eighth best quarterback in the 2015 NFL draft. NFLDraftScout.com rated him the 30th best quarterback in the draft. Some thought that Cato's size would hurt his draft chances.

Despite an impressive college career, Cato went undrafted during the 2015 draft. On May 7, Cato was invited to a camp tryout with the Cleveland Browns of the NFL but was not signed.

Montreal Alouettes

On May 16, 2015, Cato signed a two-year deal with the CFL's Montreal Alouettes. He started his first game for the Alouettes on July 3 against the Calgary Stampeders after Jonathan Crompton and Dan LeFevour sustained injuries in Week 1 against the Ottawa Redblacks. He threw a touchdown pass on his first drive as an Alouette. In the first half, Cato went 12–15 for 146 yards and 2 touchdowns. He continued in the second half with another touchdown scoring opening drive. Cato finished the game 20–25, 241 yards and 3 touchdowns for his first CFL win. For his efforts, Cato was named player of the game, with TSN analyst and Canadian Football Hall of Fame quarterback Matt Dunigan characterizing his performance as "phenomenal." He was named Player of the Week by the league for his performance against Calgary. Cato was one of three players chosen as Player of the Month for July in the CFL. Cato played in 12 games in 2015 for the Alouettes, completing 174 out of 215 pass attempts (80%) with 9 touchdowns and 9 interceptions.

Cato began the 2016 season as the number two quarterback on the depth chart behind veteran Kevin Glenn. Through the first half of the season the Alouettes only won 3 games, which prompted head coach Jim Popp to declare Cato as the starting quarterback for their Week 12 matchup against the BC Lions. In his first practice as the starting QB Cato and wide receiver Duron Carter got into a heated argument. A little over a week later Cato once again got into a heated argument at practice with Carter, this time also involving wide receiver Kenny Stafford. He was released by the Alouettes on February 6, 2017.

Richmond Roughriders

Cato signed with the Richmond Roughriders of the American Arena League in November 2017. After one game, Cato was cut from the team on March 27, 2018.

Gulf Coast Fire

On April 8, 2019 Cato signed with the Gulf Coast Fire of the A-League. He led the Gulf Coast Fire to an undefeated season and the inaugural A-League Championship.

Orlando Predators

On December 23, 2019 it was revealed that Cato had signed with the Orlando Predators of the National Arena League. The National Arena League cancelled the 2020 season due to the COVID-19 pandemic. On October 1, 2020, Cato re-signed with the Predators for the 2021 season. However, on May 27, 2021, Cato refused to report to the Predators and didn't play a game for them in the 2021 season. On December 5, 2021, Cato re-signed with the Predators for the 2022 season. On July 13, 2022, Cato was released by the Predators.

Fayetteville Mustangs

On November 6, 2022, Cato signed with the Fayetteville Mustangs of the National Arena League (NAL) for the 2023 season.

CFL career statistics

Personal life
Cato was raised in Liberty City, a neighborhood in Miami, Florida, by his mother Juannese, who worked two jobs to take care of her seven children. When Cato was thirteen, his mother died suddenly of pneumonia and his eighteen-year-old sister Shanrikia was granted custody of Cato and four other siblings. During his college career, Cato's father was released from prison, allowing Cato to meet him for the first time. Cato is a father of two young girls.

See also
 List of Division I FBS passing yardage leaders
 List of Division I FBS passing touchdown leaders

References

External links
 ESPN college stats

1992 births
Living people
American football quarterbacks
Canadian football quarterbacks
American Arena League players
Marshall Thundering Herd football players
Montreal Alouettes players
Miami Central Senior High School alumni
Players of American football from Miami
Players of Canadian football from Miami